Manhattan Movie Magazine or MMM is an American online film magazine that "cover[s] all things film- with a NY twist." It launched at the Tribeca Film Festival in 2007. Its editor-in-chief is Steve Eliau, while writer Marlow Stern has also served as an editor since its founding.

References

American film websites
Internet properties established in 2007